Peter Matić (24 March 1937 – 20 June 2019) was an Austrian stage, film, television and voice actor. He appeared in more than eighty films since 1961. In the German speaking countries he was well known as dubbing voice of Ben Kingsley.

Selected filmography

References

External links 

1937 births
2019 deaths
Austrian male film actors
Austrian male television actors
Austrian male voice actors
20th-century Austrian male actors